Folden is a former municipality in Nordland county, Norway.  The  municipality existed from 1838 until its dissolution in 1887.  Folden encompassed all of the areas surrounding the Folda fjord and all of the fjord branches that connect to the main fjord. It included all the areas in what is now Sørfold Municipality, plus the Kjerringøy area of Bodø Municipality, and the southeastern part of the Steigen Municipality.

History
The municipality of Folden was established on 1 January 1838 (see formannskapsdistrikt).  The municipality existed until 1 January 1887, when it was divided into two new municipalities: Nordfold-Kjerringøy and Sørfold.  Before the partition, Folden had a population of 3,293.

Name
The municipality is named after the local Folda fjord. The name is derived from the word  which probably means "broad" or "wide" referring to the width of the fjord. The outer part of the fjord is usually what is referred to as the Folda fjord, while the inner part of the fjord is divided into two arms Nordfolda ("the northern Folda") and Sørfolda ("the southern Folda").

Government
During its existence, this municipality was governed by a municipal council of elected representatives, which in turn elected a mayor.

Mayors
The mayors of Folden:

 1838–1843: Jørgen Meyer Heffermehl
 1843–1844: Søren Normann 
 1844–1850: Georg Taylor Faye 
 1851-1851: Gunder Enevoldsen
 1852–1856: Torer Hemsen
 1856–1862: Anders Andersen Alvenes
 1863–1864: Søren Normann
 1865–1868: Alexander Lagaard
 1869–1872: Arent Paulsen Elenjord
 1873–1878: Peder Benoni Larsen
 1879–1880: Ernst Kristian Gladsjø
 1881–1882: Petter Hansen 
 1883–1884: Henrik Normann 
 1885–1886: Lars Johnsen Wormdahl

See also
List of former municipalities of Norway

References

Former municipalities of Norway
Bodø
Steigen
Sørfold
1838 establishments in Norway
1887 disestablishments in Norway